In representation theory, a Jantzen filtration is a filtration of a Verma module of a semisimple Lie algebra, or a Weyl module of a reductive algebraic group of positive characteristic.

Jantzen filtration for Verma modules

If M(λ) is a Verma module of a semisimple Lie algebra with highest weight λ, then the Janzen filtration is a decreasing filtration

It has the following properties:
M(λ)1=N(λ), the unique maximal proper submodule of M(λ)
The quotients M(λ)i/M(λ)i+1 have non-degenerate contravariant bilinear forms.
 The Jantzen sum formula holds: 

 where  denotes the formal character.

References

Lie algebras
Representation theory